Love of My Life is a 2017 Canadian comedy film directed by Joan Carr-Wiggin.

Cast 
 Anna Chancellor as Grace
 John Hannah as Richard
 Hermione Norris as Tamara
 James Fleet as Tom
 Katie Boland as Zoe
 Hannah Anderson as Kaitlyn

Reception 
On Rotten Tomatoes, the film has an approval rating of 17% based on 6 reviews, with an average rating of 3.30/10.

Simran Hans of The Observer gave the film 1/5 stars, writing: "Unfortunately, even Chancellor, so brilliant and sharp as Lix Storm in BBC2's newsroom drama The Hour, can't save this undignified affair, gritting her teeth through writer-director Carr-Wiggin's cringeworthy script." Kevin Maher of The Times also gave the film 1/5 stars, calling it "a baffling, breathtakingly inept rom-com that plays like a horrifying cross-fertilisation of Richard Curtis comedies with Robin Askwith sex films." Mike McCahill of The Guardian gave the film 2/5 stars, writing: "The actors strive to give it spark and emotional amplitude, but the script barely seems to understand how humans exist hour-by-hour, let alone in moments of mortal crisis."

References

External links 
 

2017 comedy films
2017 films
Canadian comedy films
English-language Canadian films
Films shot in Sault Ste. Marie, Ontario
2010s English-language films
2010s Canadian films